The Turi is a caste found in the state of Jharkhand, Odisha and West Bengal in India. The traditionally involved in the manufacture of household items of bamboo.

Etymology
The word Turi is derived from Tokri a basket made from bamboo.

Origin
The Turi were traditionally involved in making household items from bamboo such as Tokri (basket), Sup (winnowing sieve), fan etc. According to Herbert Hope Risley, they are offshoot of Munda tribe as they still speak a dialect of Munda language. 
According to Robert Vane Russell, In Lohardaga (Present Lohardaga, Ranchi, Gumla, Simdega, Khunti district), the caste is divided into four subgroup: Turi or Kishan, Turi, Dom and Domra. Turi kishan are cultivater and make the sup, a winnowing sieve, the tokri, a basket of bamboo and  the sair and nadua for catching fish. The Ors are said to derive their name from the oriya basket used by the sower, and made of split bamboo. They also make umbrellas, and the chhota dali, a flat basket. Doms make the Jiarka and scale-pans. Domras make the peti and fans. Dom and Domra speak Hindi. Turi, Ors and Birhor speak a dialect of Mundari among themselves. Turi are an offshoot from the Mundas, with an admixture of Doms and other low Uriya (Odia) castes. They have Surname such as Majhi, Bagh, Turi, Malik (Odisha), Sardar(West Bengal). They have tomemic clans such as Bagerhar, Bar (Banayan), Charchagiya, Hansda (wild goose), Induar (eel), Kachhua (turtle), Surain, Baghel, Madalwar, Sumat, Jari, Kerketta, Molia in Bihar, Jharkhand, Chhattisgarh and Baghar, Hansda, Jaddi, Manjhi in Odisha and Kashyap in West Bengal.

Present circumstances
Turi are divided into many subgroups. They are further divided into various exogamous clans. Family of Turi are mostly patrilocal and patrilineal. 
They are employed in Cultivation, basketry and labour. They speak Odia, Laria, Hindi. Their festival are Kalipuja, Durgapuja, Nuakhai, Raja, Dola, Rathjatra, Makar. In modern period, the traditional business of basketry is in danger as there are lots of household items of plastic available in market. But traditional basket made of bamboo are in demand during festivals. According to the 2011 census, the population of Turi was 198,344.

Official classification
In 1931, during British Period, they were listed as aboriginal tribe. In 1936, they were listed as Backward tribe. In Patna division, Tirhut, Bengal, Hazaribagh and Manbhum, they were included in Scheduled Caste. After independence, they were included in the list of Scheduled Castes in Odisha, Jharkhand and West Bengal.

References

Social groups of West Bengal
Social groups of Jharkhand
Scheduled Castes of Odisha
Scheduled Castes of Chhattisgarh
Scheduled Castes of Jharkhand